Wilson's Sandwich Shop is a restaurant  located in Findlay, OH
founded by the owner of the Kewpee Hamburger restaurant in Lima, OH.
It is a local institution with people going there to get in touch with the community with it being a regular stop for local Courier reporters getting "man-on-the-street perspectives".  Various famous people and politicians have visited  including singer Johnny Mathis, U.S. Sen. George Voinovich, R-Ohio, and former Vice President Dan Quayle.

History
In 1936 with a Kewpee already located in Findlay, Ohio, Hoyt “Stub” Wilson, the Lima Kewpee licensee, opened a restaurant there called Wilson's Sandwich Shop. The original building was yellow and narrow as a subway car. It was example of the "enamel steel road food culture" and could host 32 people. Due to World War II meat rationing, all three of Hoyt Wilson's restaurants added the "Veggie", a special without the meat patty and a historically notable vegetable sandwich.

Wilson's estate sold ownership in the 1960s to three managers:  Wilbur Fenbert, Harold "Lance" Baker and Woodie Curtis with the Lima Kewpees going to their manager. In the middle of that same decade, a new building was constructed. The original building stayed open by being moved to the back of the lot. With the deaths of Baker and Curtis, their spouses took over their ownership interests. In 2008, then vice presidential candidate Joe Biden stopped there while on the campaign trail.

Wilson's faced possible closure in 2009 with the downturn in the economy and Occupational Safety and Health Administration fines over their hamburger patty molding machine potentially pinching operators, and electrical shock or electrocution.  With training and safety precautions not affordable, the then manager Mike Fenbert ceased using the machine and moved to purchase premade patties.  By March 2010, A new patty machine was purchased to make the patties in house once again.

By 2011, Maxie Curtis was replaced as an owner by Pam Balmer and her sister, Mary Ann Cramer, joining the other two co-owners. By May 2015, the menu was changed with shredded chick, pulled pork and salad (including slaw) were removed while adding breakfast items and the Wilson Dog dropped the slaw.

In February 2016 Wilbur Fenbert died.

In August 2019 Pat Baker died.

References

Findlay, Ohio
Restaurants established in 1936
Fast-food hamburger restaurants